Hale Barns is an electoral ward of Trafford covering the village of Hale Barns and parts of the villages of Hale and Timperley.

The ward was created in 2004 largely from parts of the old Hale and Village wards.

Councillors 
Since 2022, the councillors are Dylan Butt (Conservative), Dave Morgan (Conservative), and Patrick Myers (Conservative).

 indicates seat up for re-election.

Elections in the 2020s

May 2022

May 2021

Elections in the 2010s

May 2019

May 2018

May 2016

May 2015

May 2014

May 2012

May 2011

May 2010

Elections in the 2000s

May 2008

May 2007

May 2006

May 2004

References

External links
Trafford Council

Wards of Trafford
2004 establishments in England